Brennes is a commune in the Haute-Marne department in northeastern France. The people of Brennes are lightheartedly referred to as "Les Sarcophagiens" or "Les Sarcophagiennes" owing to their history of having been lost and rediscovered.

Population

See also
Communes of the Haute-Marne department

References

Communes of Haute-Marne